The 2018 MSA British Rally Championship was the 60th season of the series, the premier rally competition in the UK.

The championship featured eight classes:

 BRC 1 (R5, R4, Super 2000, Regional Rally Car)
 BRC Production Cup (N4)
 BRC 3 (R3)
 BRC 4 (R2)
 National Rally Cup (open class)
 Junior BRC (R2, drivers under 26 years old)
 Cadet Cup (R2, drivers under 25 years old)
 Ladies BRC Trophy

Calendar

The 2018 championship was to be contested over seven rounds in six territories England, Scotland, Wales, Northern Ireland, Isle of Man and for the second time Belgium however two events were cancelled. The events was held on both tarmac and gravel surfaces.

Border Counties Rally: On 2 March it was announced by press release that the 2018 event would be postponed. This was due to severe winter weather in the area on the weekend prior to the expected date of 10 March that would impede the stage preparation. Organisers were in talks with the BRC to make alternative arrangements however no date could be agreed and the event was abandoned for 2018.

Rally Isle of Man: On 2 September the organisers of the Rally Isle of Man, due to be held in September would be cancelled. The reason given was delays in securing the necessary Road Closure Order from the Isle of Man's Department of Infrastructure. The event is also absent from the 2019 calendar.

Team and Drivers
BRC1 Entries

BRC Productiron Cup Entries

BRC4 Entries

Junior BRC Entries

Cadet Cup Entries

Ladies BRC Trophy Entries

Event results

Podium places and information on each event.

Drivers Points Classification

Points are awarded in each class as follows: 25, 18, 15, 12, 10, 8, 6, 4, 2, 1. Competitors may nominate one event as their 'joker', on which they will score additional points: 5, 4, 3, 2, 1. Competitors six best scores will count towards their championship total, including the final round. The final round of the championship wase a double-header for points as the rally was split into two point scoring rounds.

References

British Rally Championship seasons
Rally Championship
British Rally Championship